"Emiliana" is a song by Nigerian singer and songwriter CKay, released on 3 December 2021, by Warner Music South Africa.

Background
On 4 December 2021, CKay performed a live version of "Emiliana" at The Tonight Show Starring Jimmy Fallon.

Commercial performance
"Emiliana" peaked at number one for 7 consecutive weeks on the UK Afrobeats Singles Chart.  On 6 December 2021, it was named song of the day by The Native, and debuted at number forty-four on TurnTable Top 50 on 13 December. On 16 December, it peaked at number forty-one on TurnTable Top 50 streaming songs chart. On 24 December, it peaked at number thirty-nine on TurnTable Top 50 Airplay chart.

Credits and personnel
Credits adapted from Genius.
 CKay – vocals, songwriting, production, mixing engineer
 Oboratare Abraham – additional vocals
 Bmh – songwriting, production, mixing engineer

Charts

Weekly charts

Year-end charts

Certifications

Release history

References 

2021 singles
2021 songs
CKay songs
Nigerian afropop songs